Space bomber may refer to:

 スペースボンバー or Space Bomber, a Japanese arcade game
 The alien bomber, a spacecraft from Space: 1999

 Military spacecraft bomber projects
These designs are also referred to variously as sub-orbital bombers, antipodal bombers, orbital bombers.
 Blackstar (spaceplane), a suspected USAF black project of the 1990s.
 Amerika Bomber, the Nazi Germany proposal for a very long range bomber, some of which were spacecraft.
 Silbervogel, a Nazi Germany project from Sanger.
 Mikoyan-Gurevich MiG-105 project options.
 X-20 Dyna-Soar project options.
 Keldysh bomber.
 The stratospheric bomber, a US  military project mentioned in Interstellar.